Cláudio Roberto Souza (born 14 October 1973 in Teresina, Piauí) is a Brazilian sprinter who specialized in the 100 and 200 metres.

He was a part of the Brazilian relay team which won the silver medal in 4x100 m relay at the 2000 Summer Olympics in Sydney, running only in the heats.

Souza won a silver medal in 4 x 100 metres relay at the 2003 World Championships in Paris, together with teammates Vicente de Lima, Édson Ribeiro and André da Silva. The Brazilian relay team finished eighth at the 2004 Summer Olympics. In 100 metres Souza finished fifth at the 2001 Summer Universiade in Beijing.

His personal best times are 10.19 seconds over 100 m and 20.24 s over 200 m.

External links

 Bio at Esportes UOL

1973 births
Living people
Brazilian male sprinters
Athletes (track and field) at the 2000 Summer Olympics
Athletes (track and field) at the 2004 Summer Olympics
Olympic athletes of Brazil
Olympic silver medalists for Brazil
World Athletics Championships medalists
Medalists at the 2000 Summer Olympics
Olympic silver medalists in athletics (track and field)
People from Teresina
Sportspeople from Piauí
21st-century Brazilian people